Georgian Bluffs is a township in southwestern Ontario, Canada, in Grey County located between Colpoy's Bay and Owen Sound on Georgian Bay.

The township was incorporated on January 1, 2001, by amalgamating the former townships of Derby, Keppel, and Sarawak, and the village of Shallow Lake.

History

The now-former township of Derby was surveyed by the prolific Crown land surveyor Charles Rankin in 1846.

Communities
The township comprises the communities of Alvanley, Balmy Beach, Benallen, Big Bay, Clavering, Copperkettle, Cruickshank, East Linton, Hogg, Inglis Falls, Jackson, Keady, Kemble, Kilsyth, Lake Charles, Lindenwood, Oxenden, Shallow Lake, Shouldice, Springmount, Squire, Wolseley and Zion.

Demographics 

See also
List of townships in Ontario

References

External links

Township municipalities in Ontario
Lower-tier municipalities in Ontario
Municipalities in Grey County